Wood Pearl is a natural monument (Protected areas of Ulyanovsk Oblast).

Basic special features

Trees of this Protected Area belong to genetic reserve of Russia. The prime trees are pine, birch, asp and linden. The best cultivated trees are selected. Also they grow spindle trees, filbert, bearberry, savoury, carnations, rowans and ferns. 
All managed works are prohibited with the aim to save value vegetation. Touristic visiting is limited. Researching and scientific work is not conducing.

The bases for creation of PA and its importance

Ripe pine forests, bonitet 1-1a, completeness 0,7-0,9.

References

 http://eco.ulstu.ru
 http://ulnat.by.ru/

Protected areas of Russia
Geography of Ulyanovsk Oblast